Sikkim Lokayukta is the Parliamentary Ombudsman for the state of Sikkim (India). It is a high level statutory functionary,  created to address grievances of the public against ministers, legislators, administration and public servants in issues related to misuse of power, mal-administration and corruption. It was first formed under the Sikkim Lokayukta and Deputy Lokayukta Act-2012 and approved by the president of India. The passage of Lokpal and Lokayukta's Act,2013 in Parliament had become law from January 16,2014 and requires each state to appoint its Lokayukta within a year.  A bench of Lokayukta should consist of judicial and non-judicial members. An Upa-Lokayukta is a deputy to Lokayukta and assists him in his work and acts in-charge Lokayukta in case the position fells vacant before time.

A Lokayukta of the state is appointed to office by the state Governor after consulting the committee consisting of State Chief Minister, Speaker of Legislative Assembly, Leader of Opposition,or leader of largest opposition party in State Legislature, Chairman of Legislative Council and Leader of Opposition of Legislative Council and cannot be removed from office except for reasons specified in the Act and will serve the period of five years.

History and administration 

The Sikkim Lokayukta Bill, 2017 was passed in the Sikkim Assembly on 29th December 2020 and got approved by President of India on 16 July 2012 and was effective from 2012. The bill is a tool to create Lokayukta as autonomous body for checking corruption related complaints in the state. The Bill has similar provisions as Lokpal and Lokayuktas Act,2013 passed by parliament and will cover employees of state government whether working in or out of state but under the control of state government. Sikkim is the third state to create the Law after passing the Act by Central Government and has an annual budget of Rs 2 crore for Lokayukta.

Oath or affirmation

Powers 

Sikkim Lokayukta has complete and exclusive authority for enquiring into allegations or complaints against the State Chief Minister, State Deputy Chief Minister, Ministers of the state Government, Leader of Opposition and Government officials of all grades. Lokayukta Act of the state which serves as its tool against corruption covers Chief Ministers, ex-Chief Ministers, Government officials, Ministers, IAS officers and all public servants including from local administration, police, customs and heads of companies, and societies, trusts which are partly funded by state or centre and state government employees working outside state but under control of state government.

Appointment and tenure 

Sikkim Lokayukta is Justice A P Subba, a former Judge of High Court of Sikkim from 10 july 2020 and will hold office for a term of five years or attaining the age of 70 years whichever is earlier. He is first judge from home state to be appointed as Lokayukta. Justice Kalyan Jyoti Sengupta served as Sikkim Lokayukta before Mr. Subba for a period of five years.

Notable cases 

1. In 2014, Sikkim Lokayukta on a complaint received against 18 previous ministers of the state Government on allegations of corruption had decided to inquire those.

See also 

Lokpal and Lokayukta Act,2013

References

External links 
 www.example.com

Sikkim
Lokayuktas